Shin-Fuji Station is the name of two train stations in Japan.

 Shin-Fuji Station (Hokkaido) - (新富士駅) in Hokkaidō
 Shin-Fuji Station (Shizuoka) - (新富士駅) in Shizuoka